The 2007 Toronto Blue Jays season was the franchise's 31st season of Major League Baseball. The Blue Jays tried to improve on their 87-win 2006 season, hoping to make the playoffs for the first time since 1993.

In the offseason, the Jays signed All Star outfielder Vernon Wells to one of the richest contracts in MLB history, giving him a seven-year contract worth $126 million.  Toronto also extended the contract of first baseman Lyle Overbay, and signed veteran designated hitter Frank Thomas. To offset the loss of starter Ted Lilly to the Chicago Cubs, Toronto signed Japanese pitcher Tomo Ohka and former Atlanta starter John Thomson to one-year contracts and inked former New York Mets hurler Víctor Zambrano to a minor-league deal. All three men, however, were eventually designated for assignment and released. The Jays also picked up infielder Jason Smith from the Rule 5 draft, but he too was released from his contract.

Regular season

Summary
During the month of January, Toronto signed starting pitchers John Thomson and then Tomo Ohka to incentive-based one-year contracts in an effort to strengthen their 4th and 5th rotational slots. On January 30 Toronto also signed starting pitcher Víctor Zambrano to a minor league contract, and invited him to spring training. All three were eventually released. When Brandon League, who was being considered for the main setup role, arrived to Spring training with a strained lat muscle, Zambrano took the empty spot in the bullpen. Thomson injured himself in spring training, so the Blue Jays named Ohka and Towers as their fourth and fifth starters. After four mediocre starts, Josh Towers was sent to the bullpen and replaced by Dustin McGowan. Towers returned to the rotation later in the year replacing released pitcher Tomo Ohka. When Gustavo Chacín was injured, he was replaced in the rotation by Shaun Marcum, who had a breakout year.

The season was blighted by persistent injuries, with 12 Blue Jays landing on the DL. The most serious injury was that of B. J. Ryan, who was out for the entire season having had Tommy John Surgery. However, due to the emergence of young pitchers like Dustin McGowan, Casey Janssen and Jeremy Accardo, the Jays finished 4 games above .500.

One of the most memorable games this season for the Jays was on Tuesday, June 5, 2007 when they rallied from being down 11–6 in the bottom of the ninth inning against the Tampa Bay Devil Rays to win 12–11 on an RBI walk-off base on balls by Aaron Hill, a victory that moved them to within 1 game under .500

Another memorable moment of this season was Dustin McGowan's complete game one-hitter on Sunday, June 24 against the Colorado Rockies at the Rogers Centre. McGowan carried a no-hitter into the ninth inning when outfielder Jeff Baker hit a single with no out to break it up. This was the first Jays' one-hitter since September 27, 1998, in which Roy Halladay threw against the Detroit Tigers. The Jays won 5–0 and moved themselves up to .500 for the first time since May 1 of the season. The game was also notable for Frank Thomas hitting the 499th home run of his career. The day after McGowan's gem, the Jays defeated the Minnesota Twins 8–5 to climb over the .500 mark for the first time since April and get their first four-game winning streak of the season.

On June 28, Frank Thomas became the 21st Major Leaguer to hit 500 career home runs. The pitcher who surrendered the homer was Minnesota Twins' starter Carlos Silva. Despite jumping out to an early lead the Jays couldn't hold on and ended up losing 8–5. In addition, Thomas was ejected from the game in the ninth inning by home plate umpire Mark Wegner for arguing balls and strikes.

On July 6, Reed Johnson returned to the lineup after spending three months on the DL. Johnson had been suffering back problems early in the season and received surgery, which forced him onto the 60-Day DL. This situation left Adam Lind the odd-man out in the lineup and he was optioned down to Triple-A. In his first game back Johnson went 1–3 at the plate, and made a game-saving catch in the ninth which prevented two runs (only one run scored on a sac-fly) from scoring and a runner on second (possibly third) and a one-run lead with only one out. The Jays won the game 8–6 against the Cleveland Indians.

On September 16, Aaron Hill broke the Blue Jays club record for most doubles by a second baseman in one season, set by Roberto Alomar in 1991 with 41 doubles that season. Hill recorded his 42nd double of the season against the Baltimore Orioles.

On September 17, Frank Thomas hit three home runs in a game for only the second time in his career, both times against the Boston Red Sox.

Season standings

Detailed record

Record vs. opponents

2007 Draft picks
Source 

The 2007 MLB Draft was held on June 7–8. The Blue Jays had two first round picks, along with five compensation picks.

 * The Blue Jays received the 16th pick from the Texas Rangers as compensation for signing of free agent Frank Catalanotto
 * The Blue Jays received the 38th pick as compensation for loss of free agent Justin Speier
 * The Blue Jays received the 45th pick as compensation for loss of free agent Frank Catalanotto
 * The Blue Jays received the 56th pick as compensation for loss of free agent Ted Lilly
 * The Blue Jays received the 88th pick from the Los Angeles Angels of Anaheim as compensation for signing of free agent Justin Speier

Roster

Game log

|- style="background:#bbffbb" 
| 1 || April 2 || @ Tigers || 5 – 3  || Frasor (1-0) || Rodney (0-1) || Ryan (1) || 44,297 || 1-0
|- style="background:#ffbbbb" 
| 2 || April 4 || @ Tigers || 10 – 9 || Robertson (1-0) || Burnett (0-1) || Jones (1) || 24,881 || 1-1
|- style="background:#bbbbbb"
| -- || April 5 || @ Tigers || colspan=6|Postponed (cold weather) 
|- style="background:#ffbbbb"
| 3 || April 6 || @ Devil Rays ||6 – 5 || Ryu (1-0) || Ryan (0-1) || || 38,437 || 1-2
|- style="background:#bbffbb"
| 4 || April 7 || @ Devil Rays || 8 – 5 || Marcum (1-0) || Fossum (0-1) || Ryan (2) || 18,495 || 2-2
|- style="background:#bbffbb"
| 5 || April 8 || @ Devil Rays || 6 – 3 || Halladay (1-0) || Kazmir (0-1) || Janssen (1) || 12,436 || 3-2
|- style="background:#bbffbb"
| 6 || April 9 || Royals || 9 – 1 || Burnett (1-1) || Pérez (0-2) || || 50,125 || 4-2
|- style="background:#ffbbbb"
| 7 || April 10 || Royals || 6 – 3 || Greinke (1-1) || Towers (0-1) || Soria (1) || 22,106 || 4-3
|- style="background:#bbffbb"
| 8 || April 11 || Royals || 7 – 4 || Chacín (1-0) || de la Rosa (1-1) || Ryan (3) || 15,218 || 5-3
|- style="background:#ffbbbb"
| 9 || April 12 || Tigers || 5 – 4 || Maroth (2-0) || Ohka (0-1) || Zumaya (1) || 20,416 || 5-4
|- style="background:#bbffbb"
| 10 || April 13 || Tigers || 2 – 1  || Halladay (2-0) || Rodney (1-2) || || 26,268|| 6-4
|- style="background:#ffbbbb"
| 11 || April 14 || Tigers || 10 – 7 || Ledezma (2-0) || Ryan (0-2) || Jones (6) || 28,203 || 6-5
|- style="background:#bbffbb"
| 12 || April 15 || Tigers || 2 – 1 || Towers (1-1) || Robertson (2-1) || Marcum (1) || 25,983 || 7-5
|- style="background:#bbffbb"
| 13 || April 17 || Red Sox || 2 – 1 || Chacín (2-0) || Matsuzaka (1-2) || Frasor (1) || 42,162 || 8-5
|- style="background:#ffbbbb"
| 14 || April 18 || Red Sox || 4 – 1 || Wakefield (2-1) || Ohka (0-2) || Papelbon (3) || 20,188 || 8-6
|- style="background:#ffbbbb"
| 15 || April 19 || Red Sox || 5 – 3 || Timlin (1-0) || Marcum (1-1) || Papelbon (4) || 33,297 || 8-7
|- style="background:#ffbbbb"
| 16 || April 20 || @ Orioles || 5 – 4 || Ray (2-1) || Zambrano (0-1) ||  || 25,025 || 8-8
|- style="background:#ffbbbb"
| 17 || April 21 || @ Orioles || 5 – 2 || Loewen (2-0) || Towers (1-2) || Ray (6) || 25,898 || 8-9
|- style="background:#ffbbbb"
| 18 || April 22 || @ Orioles || 7 – 3 || Trachsel (1-1) || Chacín (2-1) || || 27,285 || 8-10
|- style="background:#bbffbb"
| 19 || April 23 || @ Red Sox || 7 – 3 || Ohka (1-2) || Wakefield (2-2) || Frasor (2) || 36,669 || 9-10
|- style="background:#bbffbb"
| 20 || April 24 || @ Red Sox || 10 – 3 || Halladay (3-0) || Tavárez (0-2) || || 37,161 || 10-10
|- style="background:#bbbbbb"
| -- || April 25 || @ Yankees || colspan=6|Postponed (rain) 
|- style="background:#bbffbb"
| 21 || April 26 || @ Yankees || 6 – 0 || Burnett (2-0) || Hughes (0-1) || || 45,118 || 11-10
|- style="background:#ffbbbb"
| 22 || April 27 || Rangers || 5 – 3 || Tejeda (3-1) || Towers (1-3) || Otsuka (3) || 24,795 || 11-11
|- style="background:#ffbbbb"
| 23 || April 28 || Rangers || 9 – 8  || Otsuka (1-0) || Tallet (0-1) || Benoit (1) || 24,119 || 11-12
|- style="background:#bbffbb"
| 24 || April 29 || Rangers || 7 – 3 || Ohka (2-2) || McCarthy (1-4) || || 27,516 || 12-12
|- style="background:#bbffbb"
| 25 || April 30 || Rangers || 6 – 1 || Halladay (4-0) || Padilla (0-4) || || 19,041 || 13-12

|- style="background:#ffbbbb"
| 26 || May 1 || @ Indians || 12 – 4 || Sabathia (4-0)|| Burnett (2-2) || || 13,389 || 13-13
|- style="background:#ffbbbb"
| 27 || May 2 || @ Indians || 7 – 6  || Mastny (2-0)|| Marcum (1-2) || || 14,163 || 13-14
|- style="background:#ffbbbb"
| 28 || May 3 || @ Indians || 6 – 5 || Fultz (3-0) || Frasor (1-1) || Borowski (10) || 16,284 || 13-15
|- style="background:#ffbbbb"
| 29 || May 4 || @ Rangers || 7 – 1 || McCarthy (2-4) || Ohka (2-3) || Eyre (1) || 24,342 || 13-16
|- style="background:#ffbbbb"
| 30 || May 5 || @ Rangers || 11 – 4 || Padilla (1-4) || Halladay (4-1)|| || 27,421 || 13-17
|- style="background:#ffbbbb"
| 31 || May 6 || @ Rangers || 3 – 2 || Benoit (1-1) || Burnett (2-3) || Otsuka (4) || 19,103 || 13-18
|- style="background:#ffbbbb"
| 32 || May 8 || Red Sox || 9 – 2 || Beckett (7-0) || Zambrano (0-2) || || 41,203 || 13-19
|- style="background:#ffbbbb"
| 33 || May 9 || Red Sox || 9 – 3 || Matsuzaka (4-2) || Ohka (2-4) || || 21,784 || 13-20
|- style="background:#ffbbbb"
| 34 || May 10 || Red Sox || 8 – 0 || Wakefield (4-3)  || Halladay (4-2) || || 22,290 || 13-21
|- style="background:#bbffbb" 
| 35 || May 11 || Devil Rays || 5 – 1 || Burnett (3-3) || Kazmir (2-2) || || 20,542 || 14-21
|- style="background:#bbffbb" 
| 36 || May 12 || Devil Rays || 5 – 4 || Downs (1-0) || Stokes (1-5) || Accardo (1) || 23,208 || 15-21
|- style="background:#ffbbbb"
| 37 || May 13 || Devil Rays || 2 – 1 || Seo (2-3)|| Frasor (1-2) || Reyes (11) || 25,453 || 15-22
|- style="background:#bbffbb" 
| 38 || May 14 || Orioles || 5 – 3 || Janssen (1-0) || Báez (0-2) || Accardo (2) || 19,819 || 16-22
|- style="background:#bbffbb"
| 39 || May 15 || Orioles || 2 – 1 || Litsch (1-0) || Cabrera (3-4) || Accardo (3) || 30,958 || 17-22
|- style="background:#bbffbb"
| 40 || May 16 || Orioles || 2 – 1 || Burnett (4-3) || Burres (1-2)|| || 24,339 || 18-22
|- style="background:#ffbbbb"
| 41 || May 18 || @ Phillies || 5 – 3 || Lieber (2-2) || McGowan (0-1) || Myers (5) || 34,723 || 18-23
|- style="background:#bbffbb"
| 42 || May 19 || @ Phillies || 13 – 2 || Marcum (2-2) || Moyer (4-3) || || 32,004 || 19-23
|- style="background:#ffbbbb"
| 43 || May 20 || @ Phillies || 5 – 3 || Eaton (4-3)  || Litsch (1-1) || Myers (6) || 39,030 || 19-24
|- style="background:#bbffbb"
| 44 || May 22 || @ Orioles || 6 – 4 || Burnett (5-3) || Cabrera (3-5) || Accardo (4)  || 17,852 || 20-24
|- style="background:#ffbbbb"
| 45 || May 23 || @ Orioles || 5 – 2 || Trachsel (3-3) || McGowan (0-2) || Ray (11) || 16,938 || 20-25
|- style="background:#bbffbb"
| 46 || May 24 || @ Orioles || 5 – 4  || Janssen (2-0) || Báez (0-4) || Accardo (5) || 15,182 || 21-25
|- style="background:#ffbbbb"
| 47 || May 25 || @ Twins || 4 – 3 || Guerrier (1-1)|| Downs (1-1)|| Nathan (10) || 26,781 || 21-26
|- style="background:#bbffbb"
| 48 || May 26 || @ Twins || 9 – 8  || Tallet (1-1) || Guerrier (1-2) || || 31,434 || 22-26
|- style="background:#ffbbbb"
| 49 || May 27 || @ Twins || 4 – 2 || Silva (3-5) || Burnett (5-4) || Nathan (11) || 25,781 || 22-27
|- style="background:#bbffbb"
| 50 || May 28 || Yankees || 7 – 2 || McGowan (1-2) || DeSalvo (1-2) || || 28,791 || 23-27
|- style="background:#bbffbb"
| 51 || May 29 || Yankees || 3 – 2 || Accardo (1-0) || Pettitte (3-4) || || 30,116 || 24-27
|- style="background:#ffbbbb"
| 52 || May 30 || Yankees || 10 – 5 || Clippard (2-1) || Litsch (1-2) || Rivera (4) || 29,187 || 24-28
|- style="background:#bbffbb"
| 53 || May 31 || White Sox || 2 – 0 || Halladay (5-2) ||  Buehrle (2-2) || Accardo (6) || 22,436 || 25-28

|- style="background:#ffbbbb"
| 54 || June 1 || White Sox || 3 – 0 || Vázquez (3-3) || Burnett (5-5) || Jenks (15) || 20,051 || 25-29
|- style="background:#bbffbb"
| 55 || June 2 || White Sox || 9 – 3 || McGowan (2-2) || MacDougal (1-3) || Janssen (2) || 25,691 || 26-29
|- style="background:#bbffbb" 
| 56 || June 3 || White Sox || 4 – 3 || Tallet (2-1) || Masset (1-2) || Accardo (7) || 30,886 || 27-29
|- style="background:#bbffbb" 
| 57 || June 5 || Devil Rays || 12 – 11 || Towers (2-3) || Fossum (3-6) || || 19,063 || 28-29
|- style="background:#ffbbbb"
| 58 || June 6 || Devil Rays || 6 – 2 || Kazmir (4-3) || Ohka (2-5) || || 16,663 || 28-30
|- style="background:#ffbbbb"
| 59 || June 7 || Devil Rays || 5 – 3 || Glover (3-2) || Accardo (1-1) || Reyes (15) || 37,105 || 28-31
|- style="background:#ffbbbb"
| 60 || June 8 || @ Dodgers || 4 – 3 || Seánez (3-1) || Accardo (1-2) || || 52,173 || 28-32
|- style="background:#bbffbb" 
| 61 || June 9 || @ Dodgers || 1 – 0 || Marcum (3-2) || Lowe (6-6) || Janssen (3) || 51,057 || 29-32
|- style="background:#bbffbb" 
| 62 || June 10 || @ Dodgers || 11 – 5 || Halladay (6-2) || Schmidt (1-3) || || 50,183 || 30-32
|- style="background:#ffbbbb"
| 63 || June 11 || @ Giants || 4 – 3 || Morris (7-3) || Towers (2-4) || || 38,030 || 30-33
|- style="background:#ffbbbb"
| 64 || June 12 || @ Giants || 3 – 2 || Lowry (6-5) || Burnett (5-6) || Hennessey (3) || 37,574 || 30-34
|- style="background:#bbffbb" 
| 65 || June 13 || @ Giants || 7 – 4 || McGowan (3-2) || Lincecum (2-1) || Accardo (7) || 40,086 || 31-34
|- style="background:#bbffbb" 
| 66 || June 15 || Nationals || 7 – 2 || Halladay (7-2) || Bacsik (1-4) || || 22,042 || 32-34
|- style="background:#bbffbb"  
| 67 || June 16 || Nationals || 7 – 3 || Marcum (4-2) || Speigner (2-3) || || 26,342 || 33-34
|- style="background:#ffbbbb"
| 68 || June 17 || Nationals || 4 – 2 || Bowie (4-2) || Towers (2-5) || Cordero (11) || 28,867 || 33-35
|- style="background:#ffbbbb"
| 69 || June 19 || Dodgers || 10 – 1 || Penny (9-1) || McGowan (3-3) || || 22,763 || 33-36
|- style="background:#bbffbb"  
| 70 || June 20 || Dodgers || 12 – 1 || Halladay (8-2) || Kuo (1-2) || || 24,413 || 34-36
|- style="background:#ffbbbb"
| 71 || June 21 || Dodgers || 8 – 4 || Seánez (4-1) || Janssen (2-1) || || 25,265 || 34-37
|- style="background:#bbffbb"  
| 72 || June 22 || Rockies || 9 – 8  || Wolfe (1-0) || Fuentes (0-1) || || 27,369 || 35-37
|- style="background:#bbffbb"  
| 73 || June 23 || Rockies || 11 – 6 || Wolfe (2-0) || Cook (4-5) || || 32,482 || 36-37
|- style="background:#bbffbb"  
| 74 || June 24 || Rockies || 5 – 0 || McGowan (4-3) || Fogg (3-6) || || 33,910 || 37-37
|- style="background:#bbffbb"  
| 75 || June 25 || @ Twins || 8 – 5 || Halladay (9-2) || Guerrier (1-3) || Accardo (9) || 24,240 || 38-37
|- style="background:#ffbbbb"
| 76 || June 26 || @ Twins || 2 – 1  || Rincón (3-1) || Tallet (2-2) || || 27,000 || 38-38
|- style="background:#bbffbb" 
| 77 || June 27 || @ Twins || 5 – 4 || Towers (3-5) || Bonser (5-4) || Accardo (10) || 30,959 || 39-38
|- style="background:#ffbbbb"
| 78 || June 28 || @ Twins || 8 – 5 || Silva (6-8) || Frasor (1-3) || Nathan (15) || 31,038 || 39-39
|- style="background:#ffbbbb"
| 79 || June 29 || @ Mariners || 5 – 3 || Washburn (7-6) || McGowan (4-4) || Putz (23) || 41,862 || 39-40
|- style="background:#ffbbbb"
| 80 || June 30 || @ Mariners || 8 – 3 || Batista (8-6) || Halladay (9-3) || || 36,102 || 39-41

|- style="background:#ffbbbb"
| 81 || July 1 || @ Mariners || 2 – 1 || Putz (1-0) || Accardo (1-3) || || 38,778 || 39-42
|- style="background:#bbffbb" 
| 82 || July 2 || @ Athletics || 11 – 7 || Towers (4-5) || DiNardo (3-5) || || 13,281 || 40-42
|- style="background:#ffbbbb"
| 83 || July 3 || @ Athletics || 3 – 1 || Blanton (8-4) || Litsch (1-3) || || 35,077 || 40-43
|- style="background:#bbffbb"
| 84 || July 4 || @ Athletics || 10 – 3 || McGowan (5-4) || Kennedy (2-7) || || 26,566 || 41-43
|- style="background:#bbffbb"
| 85 || July 6 || Indians || 8 – 6 || Halladay (10-3) || Lee (5-5) || Accardo (11) || 28,526 || 42-43
|- style="background:#ffbbbb"
| 86 || July 7 || Indians || 9 – 4 || Carmona (10-4) || Marcum (4-3) || || 25,744 || 42-44
|- style="background:#bbffbb"
| 87 || July 8 || Indians || 1 – 0 || Accardo (2-3) || Byrd (7-4) || || 28,239 || 43-44
|- style="background:#ffbbbb" 
| 88 || July 12 || @ Red Sox || 7 – 4 || Wakefield (10-8) || Halladay (10-4) || Papelbon (21) || 36,887 || 43-45
|- style="background:#bbffbb"
| 89 || July 13 || @ Red Sox || 6 – 5 || Marcum (5-3) || Snyder (1-2) || Accardo (12) || 36,908 || 44-45
|- style="background:#ffbbbb"
| 90 || July 14 || @ Red Sox || 9 – 4 || Matsuzaka (11-6) || McGowan (5-5) || || 36,830 || 44-46
|- style="background:#bbffbb"
| 91 || July 15 || @ Red Sox || 2 – 1 || Litsch (2-3) || Beckett (12-3) || Accardo (13) || 36,301 || 45-46
|- style="background:#ffbbbb"
| 92 || July 16 || @ Yankees || 6 – 4 || Proctor (2-5) ||  Towers (4-6) || Rivera (14) || 52,993 || 45-47
|- style="background:#ffbbbb"
| 93 || July 17 || @ Yankees || 3 – 2  || Vizcaíno (6-2) || Janssen (2-2) || || 51,961 || 45-48
|- style="background:#ffbbbb"
| 94 || July 18 || @ Yankees || 6 – 2 || Myers (1-0) || Marcum (5-4) || Rivera (15) || 52,147 || 45-49
|- style="background:#bbffbb"
| 95 || July 19 || @ Yankees || 3 – 2 || McGowan (6-5) || Wang (10-5) || Accardo (14) || 53,857 || 46-49
|- style="background:#ffbbbb"
| 96 || July 20 || Mariners || 4 – 2|| Batista (10-7) || Litsch (2-4) || Putz (29) || 27,079 ||  46-50
|- style="background:#bbffbb"
| 97 || July 21 || Mariners || 1 – 0 || Towers (5-6) || Weaver (2-8) ||  Accardo (15) || 28,921 || 47-50
|- style="background:#bbffbb"
| 98 || July 22 || Mariners || 8 – 0 || Halladay (11-4) || Hernández (6-6) || || 29,083 || 48-50
|- style="background:#bbffbb"
| 99 || July 23 || Twins || 6 – 4 || Marcum (6-4) || Santana (11-8) || Accardo (16) || 26,091 || 49-50
|- style="background:#bbffbb"
| 100 || July 24 || Twins || 7 – 0 || McGowan (7-5) || Baker (4-4) || || 30,669 || 50-50
|- style="background:#bbffbb"
| 101 || July 25 || Twins || 13 – 1 || Litsch (3-4) || Silva (8-11) || || 37,342 || 51-50
|- style="background:#ffbbbb"
| 102 || July 27 || @ White Sox || 4 – 3 || Garland (8-7) || Towers (5-7) || Jenks (29) || 34,590 || 51-51
|- style="background:#ffbbbb"
| 103 || July 28 || @ White Sox || 2 – 0 || Buehrle (8-6) || Halladay (11-5) || Jenks (30) || 37,744 || 51-52
|- style="background:#bbffbb"
| 104 || July 29 || @ White Sox || 4 – 1 || Marcum (7-4) || Vázquez (8-6) || Accardo (17) || 36,571 || 52-52
|- style="background:#ffbbbb"
| 105 || July 30 || @ Devil Rays || 5 – 4  || Dohmann (1-0) || Wolfe (2-1) || || 8,807 || 52-53
|- style="background:#bbffbb"
| 106 || July 31 || @ Devil Rays || 2 – 0 || Litsch (4-4) || Jackson (2-11) || Accardo (18) || 10,569 || 53-53

|- style="background:#ffbbbb"
| 107 || August 1 || @ Devil Rays || 6 – 2 || Glover (5-3) || Towers (5-8) || || 10,109 || 53-54
|- style="background:#bbffbb"
| 108 || August 3 || Rangers || 6 – 4 || Halladay (12-5) || Wright (3-4) || Accardo (19) || 23,777 || 54-54
|- style="background:#bbffbb"
| 109 || August 4 || Rangers || 9 – 5 || Marcum (8-4) || Eyre (3-4) || || 25,231 || 55-54
|- style="background:#bbffbb"
| 110 || August 5 || Rangers || 4 – 1 || McGowan (8-5) || McCarthy (5-8) || Accardo (20) || 29,593 || 56-54
|- style="background:#ffbbbb"
| 111 || August 6 || Yankees || 5 – 4 || Pettitte (8-7) || Downs (1-2) || Rivera (18) || 42,714 || 56-55
|- style="background:#ffbbbb"
| 112 || August 7 || Yankees || 9 – 2 || Clemens (4-5) || Towers (5-9) || || 38,078 || 56-56
|- style="background:#bbffbb"
| 113 || August 8 || Yankees || 15 – 4 || Halladay (13-5) || Wang (13-6) || || 40,811 || 57-56
|- style="background:#bbffbb"
| 114 || August 10 || @ Royals || 2 – 1 || Marcum (9-4) || Meche (7-10) || Accardo (21) || 21,276 || 58-56
|- style="background:#ffbbbb"
| 115 || August 11 || @ Royals || 4 – 1 || Núñez (2-0) || McGowan (8-6) || Soria (13) || 25,934 || 58-57
|- style="background:#bbffbb"
| 116 || August 12 || @ Royals || 4 – 1 || Burnett (6-6)|| Bannister (8-7) || Accardo (22) || 18,381 || 59-57
|- style="background:#ffbbbb"
| 117 || August 13 || @ Royals || 6 – 2 || Pérez (7-11) || Litsch (4-5) || || 14,845 || 59-58
|- style="background:#bbffbb"
| 118 || August 14 || Angels || 4 – 1 || Halladay (14-5) || Saunders (6-1) || || 31,978 || 60-58
|- style="background:#bbffbb"
| 119 || August 15 || Angels || 2 – 1 || Marcum (10-4) || Moseley (4-2) || Accardo (23) || 30,353 || 61-58
|- style="background:#ffbbbb"
| 120 || August 16 || Angels || 4 – 3 || Escobar (13-6) || McGowan (8-7) || Rodríguez (30) || 27,861 || 61-59
|- style="background:#bbffbb"
| 121 || August 17 || Orioles || 5 – 2 || Burnett (7-6) || Olson (1-2) || Accardo (24) || 25,524 || 62-59
|- style="background:#ffbbbb"
| 122 || August 18 || Orioles || 5 – 3 || Trachsel (6-7) || Litsch (4-6) || Báez (2) || 33,387 || 62-60
|- style="background:#bbffbb"
| 123 || August 19 || Orioles || 3 – 2  || Downs (2-2) || Bradford (2-6) || || 38,132 || 63-60
|- style="background:#ffbbbb"
| 124 || August 20 || Athletics || 6 – 4 || Blanton (11-8) || Marcum (10-5) || Street (11) || 27,193 || 63-61
|- style="background:#ffbbbb"
| 125 || August 21 || Athletics || 6 – 4 || Haren (14-4) || Tallet (2-3) || Street (12) || 32,639 || 63-62
|- style="background:#ffbbbb"
| 126 || August 22 || Athletics || 4 – 1 || Loaiza (1-0) || Burnett (7-7) || Embree (16) || 31,145 || 63-63
|- style="background:#bbffbb"
| 127 || August 23 || @ Angels || 5 – 4 || Litsch (5-6) || Santana (5-12) || Accardo (25) || 41,009 || 64-63
|- style="background:#ffbbbb"
| 128 || August 24 || @ Angels || 3 – 0 || Weaver (9-6) || Halladay (14-6) || Rodríguez (32) || 41,131 || 64-64
|- style="background:#bbffbb"
| 129 || August 25 || @ Angels || 9 – 2 || Marcum (11-5) || Saunders (7-2) || || 41,631 || 65-64
|- style="background:#ffbbbb"
| 130 || August 26 || @ Angels || 3 – 1 || Escobar (15-6) || McGowan (8-8) || Rodríguez (33) || 40,565 || 65-65
|- style="background:#bbffbb"
| 131 || August 27 || @ Athletics || 6 – 2  || Accardo (3-3) || Embree (1-2) || || 18,092 || 66-65
|- style="background:#bbffbb"
| 132 || August 28 || @ Athletics || 5 – 4 || Wolfe (3-1) || Brown (2-1) || Janssen (4) || 20,542 || 67-65
|- style="background:#ffbbbb"
| 133 || August 29 || @ Athletics || 5 – 4  || Lugo (5-0) || Frasor (1-4) || || 16,015 || 67-66
|- style="background:#bbffbb"
| 134 || August 31 || Mariners || 7 – 5 || Marcum (12-5) || Washburn (9-12) || Accardo (26) || 34,518 || 68-66

|- style="background:#bbffbb"
| 135 || September 1 || Mariners || 2 – 1 || McGowan (9-8) || Green (5-2) || Accardo (27) || 30,672 || 69-66
|- style="background:#bbffbb"
| 136 || September 2 || Mariners || 6 – 4 || Burnett (8-7) || Weaver (6-11) || Janssen (5) || 32,166 || 70-66
|- style="background:#ffbbbb"
| 137 || September 3 || @ Red Sox || 13 – 10 || Matsuzaka (14-11) || Litsch (5-7) || Papelbon (32) || 36,639 || 70-67
|- style="background:#ffbbbb"
| 138 || September 4 || @ Red Sox || 5 – 3 || Beckett (17-6) || Halladay (14-7) || Papelbon (33) || 36,839 || 70-68
|- style="background:#bbffbb"
| 139 || September 5 || @ Red Sox || 6 – 4 || Accardo (4-3) || Okajima (3-2) || || 37,106 || 71-68
|- style="background:#bbffbb"
| 140 || September 7 || @ Devil Rays || 7 – 2 || McGowan (10-8) || Jackson (4-14) || || 18,617 || 72-68
|- style="background:#ffbbbb"
| 141 || September 8 || @ Devil Rays || 5 – 4 || Reyes (2-2) || Accardo (4-4)|| || 19,822 || 72-69
|- style="background:#ffbbbb"
| 142 || September 9 || @ Devil Rays || 3 – 2 || Shields (10-8) || Litsch (5-8) || Reyes (23) || 20,556 || 72-70
|- style="background:#ffbbbb"
| 143 || September 10 || @ Tigers || 5 – 4 || Bazardo (1-1) || Janssen (2-3) || || 35,689 || 72-71
|- style="background:#ffbbbb"
| 144 || September 11 || Yankees || 9 – 2 || Hughes (3-3) || Marcum (12-6) || || 30,472 || 72-72
|- style="background:#ffbbbb"
| 145 || September 12 || Yankees || 4 – 1 || Mussina (9-10) || McGowan (10-9) || Rivera (26) || 27,082 || 72-73
|- style="background:#bbffbb"
| 146 || September 13 || Yankees || 2 – 1 || Downs (3-2) || Britton (0-1) || || 32,632 || 73-73
|- style="background:#ffbbbb"
| 147 || September 14 || Orioles || 6 – 2 || Burres (6-5) || Litsch (5-9) || || 31,106 || 73-74
|- style="background:#bbffbb"
| 148 || September 15 || Orioles || 8 – 3 || Halladay (15-7) || Birkins (1-2) || || 37,441 || 74-74
|- style="background:#ffbbbb"
| 149 || September 16 || Orioles || 8 – 6  || Bell (4-3) || Frasor (1-5) || Cabrera (1)|| 38,934 || 74-75
|- style="background:#bbffbb"
| 150 || September 17 || Red Sox || 6 – 1 || McGowan (11-9) || Wakefield (16-11) || || 29,316 || 75-75
|- style="background:#bbffbb"
| 151 || September 18 || Red Sox || 4 – 3 || Burnett (9-7) || Gagné (3-2) || Downs (1) || 32,390 || 76-75
|- style="background:#bbffbb"
| 152 || September 19 || Red Sox || 6 – 1 || Litsch (6-9) || Buchholz (3-1) || Accardo (28) || 34,927 || 77-75
|- style="background:#bbffbb"
| 153 || September 21 || @ Yankees || 5 – 4  || Kennedy (4-9) || Bruney (3-2) || Frasor (3) || 54,151 || 78-75
|- style="background:#ffbbbb"
| 154 || September 22 || @ Yankees || 12 – 11  || Karstens (1-3) || Towers (5-10) || || 54,887 || 78-76
|- style="background:#ffbbbb"
| 155 || September 23 || @ Yankees || 7 – 5 || Mussina (11-10) || McGowan (11-10) || Chamberlain (1) || 54,983 || 78-77
|- style="background:#bbffbb"
| 156 || September 24 || @ Yankees || 4 – 1 || Litsch (7-9) || Pettitte (14-9) || Janssen (6) || 53,261 || 79-77
|- style="background:#bbffbb"
| 157 || September 25 || @ Orioles || 11 – 4 || Burnett (10-7) || Burres (6-7) || || 15,867 || 80-77
|- style="background:#bbffbb"
| 158 || September 26 || @ Orioles || 8 – 5 || Halladay (16-7) || Zambrano (0-3) || Accardo (29) || 15,424 || 81-77
|- style="background:#ffbbbb"
| 159 || September 27 || @ Orioles || 8 – 5 || Hoey (3-4) || Tallet (2-4) || Walker (7) || 15,817 || 81-78
|- style="background:#bbffbb"
| 160 || September 28 || Devil Rays || 5 – 4 || McGowan (12-10) || Sonnanstine (6-10) || Accardo (30) || 34,670 || 82-78
|- style="background:#bbffbb"
| 161 || September 29 || Devil Rays || 5 – 3 || Downs (4-2) || Wheeler (1-9) || || 37,681 || 83-78
|- style="background:#ffbbbb"
| 162 || September 30 || Devil Rays || 8 – 5 || Hammel (3-5) || Burnett (10-8) || Reyes (26) || 44,156 || 83-79

Player stats

Batting

Note: G = Games played; AB = At bats; H = Hits; Avg. = Batting average; HR = Home runs; RBI = Runs batted in; R = Runs; SB = Stolen bases

As of September 30, 2007

Pitching

Starting and other pitchers
Note: GS = Games started; IP = Innings pitched; W = Wins; L = Losses; ERA = Earned run average; BB = Walks allowed; SO = Strikeouts 

As of September 30, 2007

Relief pitchers
Note: G = Games pitched; IP = Innings pitched; W = Wins; L = Losses; SV = Saves; H = Holds; ERA = Earned run average; BB = Walks allowed; SO = Strikeouts

As of September 30, 2007

Draft
This is a partial list. For the full draft, see here.

Players Selected

Farm system

LEAGUE CHAMPIONS: Auburn

References

Game Logs:
1st Half: Toronto Blue Jays Game Log on ESPN.com
2nd Half: Toronto Blue Jays Game Log on ESPN.com
Batting Statistics: Toronto Blue Jays stats on ESPN.com
Pitching Statistics: Toronto Blue Jays pitching stats on ESPN.com

External links
2007 Toronto Blue Jays team page at Baseball Reference
2007 Toronto Blue Jays team page at www.baseball-almanac.com

Toronto Blue Jays seasons
Toronto Blue Jays season
2007 in Canadian sports
2007 in Toronto